The 2014 Rally Sweden was a motor racing event for rally cars that was held over four days between 5 and 8 February, which marked the 62nd running of the Rally Sweden.

The event was won by Finland's Jari-Matti Latvala of the Volkswagen Motorsport team, taking his third victory in Sweden, and the ninth victory of his WRC career. He finished 53.6 seconds clear of his teammate Andreas Mikkelsen – taking his best WRC finish – while the podium was completed by Mads Østberg, a further 5.9 seconds in arrears. Latvala's victory allowed him to take the championship lead from another teammate, Sébastien Ogier, who could only finish sixth in Sweden. In the supporting WRC-2 category, Karl Kruuda edged out Jari Ketomaa by 2.3 seconds for the victory.

Entry list

Results

Event standings

Championship standings after the race

WRC

Drivers' Championship standings

Manufacturers' Championship standings

Other

WRC2 Drivers' Championship standings

WRC3 Drivers' Championship standings

References

External links
The official website of the World Rally Championship
Results – juwra.com/World Rally Archive
Results – ewrc-results.com

Sweden
Swedish Rally
Rally Sweden